The Gretsch 6120 is a hollow body electric guitar with f-holes, manufactured by Gretsch and first appearing in the mid-1950s with the endorsement of Chet Atkins.  It was quickly adopted by rockabilly artists Eddie Cochran, Duane Eddy, and later by Eric Clapton, Brian Setzer, Reverend Horton Heat, and many others. Pete Townshend received one as a gift from Joe Walsh in 1970, which he would later use on recordings for Who's Next and Quadrophenia. Poison Ivy Rorschach of The Cramps notably played a 1958 Gretsch 6120, which she bought in 1985. She said it was her favourite guitar to play. 
After George Harrison played Gretsch Country Gentleman and Tennessean models (which, like the 6120, were developed with and endorsed by Chet Atkins), Gretsch found that they could scarcely keep up with demand.

Production history
The 6120 was the first in the line of "Chet Atkins" signature Gretsch Guitars. The prototype for the 6120 was first presented to Chet Atkins in 1954 and was labeled as a Streamliner Special with the serial number 13753. A second prototype was made, adding a vibrato tailpiece and a metal nut. Both prototypes had an unbound headstock, which didn't carry over to the production models of the 6120 when it debuted in 1955.

Originally priced at $385, the 6120 was quite expensive compared to models from other companies, such as Gibson's Les Paul Goldtop which retailed at $225 or Fender's Telecaster at $189.50.

In 1958, the thumbnail "neoclassic" fret markers were introduced. The DeArmond pickups were discontinued, with Gretsch using their own "FilterTron" humbuckers.

Due to changes in musical tastes and changes in Gretsch company ownership in the late 1960s resulting in deteriorating quality, production of the 6120 ceased in the late 1970s. Values of the existing instruments soared when rockabilly artist Brian Setzer of the Stray Cats was seen playing an old 6120 in his early 1980s music videos. Gretsch subsequently went back into the guitar business and new 6120 guitars are widely available.

Today, a wide range of 6120 models are available, including an assortment of Brian Setzer signature models and faithful reissues of 1950s classics. Like most Gretsch guitars, production is now based in Japan at the Terada factory, although custom-shop American-made 6120s are also available.

Variants
Note that in the mid-1960s, the proper name of the 6120 changed from "6120 Chet Atkins Hollow Body" to "6120 Nashville", but the original name is again in use, although a Brian Setzer signature model is called the "Brian Setzer Nashville" (another 6120 is called the Brian Setzer Hot Rod).

Brian Setzer Collection
Brian Setzer Nashville
G6120SH - Brian Setzer Hot Rod (using "Hot Rod" FilterTron or TV Jones pickups)

Chet Atkins Collection
Chet Atkins Hollow Body (including several reissue models and "DynaSonic" pickups on others).

Signature models
6120KS — Keith Scott
6120RHH — The Reverend Horton Heat
6120CC — Chris Cheney
6120DE    — Duane Eddy
6120EC    — Eddie Cochran
6120SSLVO — Brian Setzer Nashville
6120T SW - Steve Wariner

References

External links
Gretsch Guitars

6120
Semi-acoustic guitars